Dayuan District, formerly known as Dayuan Township is a coastal district in northwestern Taoyuan City, Taiwan.

History
Dayuan District was originally named Toa-khu-hng, literally means a vast (大) vegetable garden (坵園) as an old Chinese name).  In the earlier days, cottage scattered around the district with very limited settlers that grows vegetable and sweet potatoes.  Hoklo people migrated to the area during the rule of Kangxi.  In avoidance of the invasion of Yue people, walled villages were built around the settlements of Hoklo people.  It was renamed  during Japanese rule, and was part of Tōen District, Shinchiku Prefecture. After the handover of Taiwan from Japan to the Republic of China, it was called Dayuan Township. It became Dayuan District in 2014, when Taoyuan County became a special municipality (and the former city of Taoyuan became a district of the special municipality).

Geography

Demographics
The population in 1986 was 56,995. By the end of February 2023, the total population had grown to 86,007. It is considered a slow population growing district.

 Area: 87.3925 km2
 Population: 86,007 people (February 2023)

Topology
Dayuan District has an inclining topography from southwest to northwest with an average height of 35 meters above sea level. Inland area are mostly plains, rice fields or spacious flat lands, while in the northeast part is the prolonged sand beach seacoast.

Climate
The district lies in the subtropic monsoon climate region. In winter, northwest monsoon is stronger and in the coldest months, the average temperature is about 11 °C. In summer, it rains a lot but it is free from droughts during the winter seasons.

Administrative divisions

The district consists of 18 villages and 407 neighborhoods. The villages are:
 Dahai Village
 Dayuan Village
 Guolin Village
 Haikou Village
 Hengfong Village
 Heping Village
 Houcuo Village
 Jhuwei Village
 Nangang Village
 Neihai Village
 Peikang Village
 Pusin Village
 Sanshih Village
 Shalun Village
 Sihai Village
 Tiansin Village
 Wucyuan Village
 Zuntou Village

Economy

Transportation
China Airlines’s headquarters, CAL Park, is on the grounds of Taiwan Taoyuan International Airport in Dayuan District. Evergreen Airlines Services Corporation, Evergreen Aviation Technologies Corp., and Evergreen Air Cargo Services Corporation, subsidiaries of Evergreen Group, are also headquartered in Dayuan.

Agriculture
The main agriculture products of the district are paddy rice, watermelons, crops, vegetables, peanuts etc. To improve the agriculture industry, various innovations have been introduced in the area, such as the plantation of various types of flowers and plants for export and import markets, plantation of green onions and the development of shelf network of room vegetables and other crops.

Fishery
Fishery products are mostly in the irrigated ponds with a lot of grass carps, silver carps, carps, tilapia etc. The district has the biggest fishing port in Taoyuan County with a capacity of 50 ships in the interior part and 100 ships in the exterior part. Main fish species including pomfrets, sharks and mullets.

Industry
The district houses the Dayuan Specialized Industry Park, Dayuan Extended Industry Park and Chun-Fa Industry Park. The main industries including chemical products, leather products, dyes, papermaking, metal, textiles, electronic and electric appliances manufacturing, food processing etc.

Commerce
The main commerce industry is retailing business, such as department stores, restaurants, silver-goods shops, furniture, electric appliances, finance, automobiles, motorcycles, gas stations, parking lots etc.

Education
The district is home to one private senior high school, two public junior high schools 12 public elementary schools, 17 public nursery schools, 11 private nursery schools, 3 private kindergartens. It also houses one district library and one community library.

Tourist attractions
 Hengshan Calligraphy Art Center
 Xihai Flower Garden Zone
 Zhuwei Fish Harbor

Transportation

Air
Taiwan Taoyuan International Airport

Road
The district is served by National Highway No. 2. Bus station in the district is Dayuan Bus Station of Taoyuan Bus.

Taoyuan Airport MRT
 Airport Terminal 1 Station
 Airport Terminal 2 Station
 Airport Terminal 3 Station (under construction; scheduled for completion in 2025)
 Airport Hotel Station
 Dayuan Station
 Hengshan Station
 Linghang Station

See also

 Taoyuan City

References

External links
 
  

Districts of Taoyuan City